Madrid, the capital of Spain, is divided into 21 districts, which are further subdivided into 131 administrative wards. Additional neighborhoods exist outside the boundaries of administrative borders. Each district is governed by a body named Junta Municipal de Distrito. Residents of Madrid are typically called Madrileños.

Districts and wards 
Data as of 1st January 2017. Source: Área de Gobierno de Economía, Hacienda. Subdirección General de Estadística. Padrón Municipal de Habitantes.

Popular neighbourhoods

Contemporary Madrid came into its own after the death of general Francisco Franco. Reaction against the dictatorial bureaucracy centered in Madrid, and a history of centralism that predated Franco by centuries has resulted in the successful modern movement towards increased autonomy for the regions of Spain, considered autonomous regions under the umbrella of Spain. The modern metropolis is home to over three million people.

Alonso Martínez 
This area contains the large Plaza de Colón. This plaza commemorates Christopher Columbus, who was responsible for ushering in the Spanish imperial golden age of the 16th and 17th centuries.  It is within walking distance of the main cultural and commercial areas of the city, such as the Prado museum, the expansive Parque del Buen Retiro and the business center on the lower part of the Paseo de la Castellana.

Atocha 
Atocha covers a large area and is bordered by the Huertas and Lavapiés neighbourhoods. It contains several notable cultural institutions, including the Reina Sofía Museum. Also located here is the central bus terminal and the Atocha Railway Station, one of two main train stations in Madrid, the other being located in Chamartín. This was the main site of the train bombings carried out on March 11, 2004. Atocha was also the site of the 1977 Massacre of Atocha.

AZCA / Nuevos Ministerios 

Located in the Cuatro Caminos ward, AZCA is the financial center of Madrid. The skyscraper Torre Windsor once stood here as well, until it burned completely on the night of 12 February 2005. A large El Corte Inglés department store consisting of three interconnected buildings is also located here. The area is directly linked to Barajas Airport by metro line 8 at the Nuevos Ministerios station. It's the Parkour centre of Madrid.

Cuatro Torres Business Area 
The Cuatro Torres Business Area is composed of the four tallest skyscrapers in Madrid. It was designed by Sir Norman Foster, and is the third tallest skyscraper in Europe. The fourth skyscraper is Torre Espacio, or 'Space Tower'. The four skyscrapers were finished in 2008.

Chueca 
Chueca is well known as a centre of gay culture in Madrid.

Las Cortes 
This small area is notable for housing the Congress of Deputies, known as the Congreso de los diputados, the lower house of the Spanish parliament. Other notable sites include the Thyssen-Bornemisza Museum, the Banco de España, the Café del Círculo de Bellas Artes, the Zarzuela Theater and the Plaza de Cibeles.

Huertas 
This neighbourhood, also known as Barrio de las Letras, is west of the Paseo del Prado and north of Calle Atocha. Once the home and popular hangout of writers such as Miguel de Cervantes and Calderon de la Barca, Huertas is now considered Madrid's literary neighbourhood. One prominent landmark is the house where Cervantes died in 1616.  It is a popular nightlife spot and tourist destination.

Gran Vía 

As the name implies, the Gran Vía area contains one of Madrid's most important avenues, the Gran Vía (literally, "Great Way"). First and foremost it is a shopping street; however, it also contains a number of tourist accommodations, plenty of nightlife (including Madrid's large goth scene), many of Madrid's largest movie theaters and live musical shows. It is also a hub for Madrid's red-light district, as it links many side streets. One of these streets, calle Fuencarral, has become a link between the old shopping area of the center of the city, the Bohemian Malasaña, and the hip Chueca district, making of it one of the most cosmopolitan areas of the city.

Lavapiés 
A historically poorer neighbourhood within the city center, Lavapiés has maintained much of true 'Madrileño' spirit of the past. Lavapiés has a high concentration of immigrants (mainly Bangladeshis), and also tends to attract Western European expats, artists and writers, adding to the cosmopolitan mix. It is changing rapidly under the pressures of gentrification.

La Latina 

In and around La Latina are the origins of Madrid. Its difficult to put precise boundaries on La Latina, because, like its immediate neighbours, streets are narrow and winding. There are quite a few nightlife spots, though the neighbourhood is best known as having a concentration of tapas bars (particularly on the Cava Baja and Cava Alta). There are also a number of attractive churches, including the Church of San Andrés and the San Francisco el Grande Basilica. On Sundays and major holidays, the famous Rastro flea-market begins on the eastern edge, spilling out of the San Millan exit of the La Latina metro stop to the Plaza de Cascorro and all the way to the Ronda de Toledo to the south. Plaza de la Paja is another interesting location here. On its other side, La Latina borders Plaza Mayor and another ancient part of the town, El Madrid de los Austrias, where you can find the beautiful Palacio Real (Royal Palace).

Malasaña 
Malasaña is famous for its nightlife, and for having been the main hub of the movida countercultural movement in the 1970s and 1980s. Considered very popular and one of the best´s Madrid´s neighbourhoods with available pubs and bars during night.

Ópera 
As the name implies, this area around the Ópera metro stop is the location of Madrid's main Opera Theatre, the Teatro Real (Royal Theatre). In front of the theatre is the Palacio Real de Madrid, or Royal Palace. The Royal Palace is no longer used as a residence, but it has been kept intact, serving as a cultural monument that is occasionally used for state functions. It's one of largest palaces in Europe, surpassing even the Versailles Palace.

Retiro 

Barrio Retiro is a classic neighbourhood surrounding the famous Buen Retiro Park, to the east of the center of the city. It is demographically the oldest neighbourhood in the city, but over the past five years the increasing number of flats for rent has been attracting young people and students to the area in growing numbers. The neighbourhood can be characterized by the style of its three most important areas. In the north, centering on Calle Ibiza, streets are in a grid pattern and buildings, normally 6-10 storeys, are packed closely together, creating a bustling atmosphere of small shops, bars, and restaurants. This area is very similar to the neighbouring Salamanca district. In the south, called Niño Jesus, the area is quieter, more spacious, and residential. In the west, the Jerónimos area, with its beautiful 18th and 19th century buildings and many museums (including the Museo del Prado), has few private residences, its large flats that often surpass 200 m² (2,150 sq ft) being mainly used for offices.

Hortaleza 
A residential district in the north, Hortaleza includes the headquarters of the Spanish Olympic Committee, the IFEMA (Madrid's main trade fair centre) and Juan Carlos I Park, a park between Campo de las Naciones (commercial district) and Barajas. Mar de Cristal is a tube station in Hortaleza district with an airport connection.

Vallecas 
Vallecas is a working-class residential neighbourhood in the south of Madrid. It is also home to the Rayo Vallecano football team.

Aravaca 
Aravaca is an upper-class residential suburb in the northwest of Madrid. During the Spanish Civil War the front was stabilized here for almost three years. Aravaca and its surroundings include parkland and wooded areas such as Casa de Campo.

Notes

References

External links